Oscar Sylvester "Cotton" Siemer (August 14, 1901 – December 5, 1959) was a Major League Baseball player. He played two seasons with the Boston Braves from 1925 to 1926.

References

External links

1901 births
1959 deaths
Baseball players from St. Louis
Boston Braves players
Brooklyn Dodgers scouts
Corsicana Oilers players
Dallas Steers players
Danville Veterans players
Des Moines Demons players
Hutchinson Wheat Shockers players
Los Angeles Dodgers scouts
Louisville Colonels (minor league) players
Major League Baseball catchers
Quincy Indians players
St. Paul Saints (AA) players
San Antonio Indians players
Terre Haute Tots players